Merlischachen railway station is a railway station in the municipality of Küssnacht, in the Swiss canton of Schwyz. It is an intermediate stop on the standard gauge Lucerne–Immensee line of Swiss Federal Railways.

Services 
 the following services stop at Merlischachen:

References

External links 
 
 

Railway stations in the canton of Schwyz
Swiss Federal Railways stations